The 2nd FINA World Youth Swimming Championships, or 2008 Youth Worlds, were held on July 8–13, 2008, in Monterrey, Nuevo León, Mexico.

The Championships were held at the Aquatics Center of the Universidad Autónoma de Nuevo León (Centro Acuático Olímpico Universitario). In May 2008, this same pool hosted the swimming portion of the 2008 Mexican National Olympiad, which served as the country's selection meet for Mexico's teams to the 2008 Olympics.

The male participants had to be 18 years or younger on the 31 December 2008 (i.e. born 1990 or later). The female participants had to be 17 years or younger on the 31 December 2008 (i.e. born 1991 or later).

Medals table

Medal summary

Boy's events

Girl's events

See also
2008 in swimming

External links
 Swim Rankings Results

Swimming
Youth
FINA World Junior Swimming Championships
Y
International aquatics competitions hosted by Mexico